Ännikse is a village in Lääneranna Parish, Pärnu County, in southwestern Estonia. It has a population of 10 (as of 1 January 2011).

Ännikse–Kilgi–Vaiste railway line for lumber transport operated from 1919 to 1950.

References

Villages in Pärnu County